Maplewood is historic home located at Columbia, Missouri, United States.  It was built by Slater Ensor Lenoir and his wife Margaret Bradford Lenoir in 1877. It is a two-story, Italianate style brick dwelling.  It was listed on the National Register of Historic Places in 1979.

This became the Frank G. Nifong Memorial Park. Today, the home  is operated jointly by the Boone County Historical Society and City of Columbia Parks and Recreation.

Things to do near the building include the annual Heritage Festival in September and the Maplewood Barn Theatre productions all year round.

References

External links
 Boone County Historical Society

Houses on the National Register of Historic Places in Missouri
Houses completed in 1877
Italianate architecture in Missouri
Houses in Columbia, Missouri
Museums in Columbia, Missouri
African-American history in Columbia, Missouri
Historic house museums in Missouri
National Register of Historic Places in Boone County, Missouri
1877 establishments in Missouri